YC Liang CBE (1918–1979) was a businessman in British Hong Kong. He was an agent in the British Army Aid Group during World War II. He was the father of hydrofoil business between Hong Kong and Macau and a co-founder of Hang Seng Bank.

Career 

In 1951, YC Liang founded the Yu On Shipping Company (裕安輪船) together with Ho Yin and Ho Tim.

References 

1918 births
1979 deaths
Commanders of the Order of the British Empire
Hong Kong bankers
Hang Seng Bank